Catherine Beauvais (born 11 January 1965 at Argenteuil) is a former French athlete, who specialised in the discus throw.

Biography  
Beauvais won two championship titles of France in the discus: in 1983 and 1984. She improved twice the French record bringing it to 56.48m then 57.50m in 1983.

She won the silver medal in the 1983 Mediterranean Games and the 1989 Games of La Francophonie.

Achievements 
 French Championships in Athletics   :  
 2-time winner of the discus in 1983 and 1984

Records

References  

 

1965 births
Living people
French female discus throwers
Sportspeople from Argenteuil
Mediterranean Games silver medalists for France
Mediterranean Games medalists in athletics
Athletes (track and field) at the 1983 Mediterranean Games